Air Marshal Sir David Allan Walker,  (born 14 July 1956) is a Director at Alexander Mann Solutions, and a member of the Advisory Board of Auticon. He is a retired senior Royal Air Force officer and Master of the Household to the Sovereign.

RAF career
Walker was commissioned in the Administrative Branch of the Royal Air Force (RAF) on 1 September 1974. He was regraded to pilot officer on 15 July 1977 (seniority 15 October 1975), promoted to flying officer on 15 January 1978 (seniority 15 April 1976), and promoted to flight lieutenant on 15 October 1980. Walker was appointed a Member of the Royal Victorian Order (MVO) in 1992, and an Officer of the Order of the British Empire (OBE) in 1995.

Walker became Station commander at RAF Halton in 1997, Director of Corporate Communications for the RAF in 1998 and Director of Personnel and Training Policy in 2002. He went on to be Air Officer Commanding the RAF Training Group in 2003 before being seconded to Buckingham Palace in 2005 as Master of the Household to the Sovereign. Walker was knighted as a Knight Commander of the Royal Victorian Order (KCVO) in the 2011 Birthday Honours, being invested in a personal audience with Queen Elizabeth II on 13 July 2011.

Corporate career
On retiring from the Royal Household in 2013, Walker joined HSBC as Senior Advisor to the Group Executive Chairman, and undertook a similar role as an independent consultant to Barclays Bank, from 2014 to 2015, advising the Group CEO. In 2015 he joined the Board of Alexander Mann Solutions and became a senior advisor to PwC until 2018. In 2016 he became a member of the Advisory Board of Auticon, a social enterprise providing employment for autistic people in IT consulting.

Personal life
Walker is the son of Allan Walker and Audrey (née Brothwell). In 1983, he married Jane Alison Fraser Calder.

References

1956 births
Living people
Royal Air Force air marshals
Knights Commander of the Royal Victorian Order
Officers of the Order of the British Empire
Deputy Lieutenants of Gloucestershire
Fellows of the Royal Aeronautical Society
People educated at the City of London School
Equerries
Masters of the Household